Woman in the Dark (also released as Woman in the Shadows)  is a 1934 American crime drama film directed by Phil Rosen and based on a 1933 short story by Dashiell Hammett. It was filmed at Biograph Studios by Select Pictures and released by RKO Radio Pictures.

Plot 
Released from prison on parole, John Bradley plans to live alone quietly in a cabin in the country. He is visited there by the sheriff's daughter, Helen Grant, on whose account he had got into a fight and accidentally killed a man in the past. While he is trying to persuade her to leave, a beautiful disheveled woman in evening dress bursts in. This is Louise Loring, who has run away on foot from her rich "protector", Tony Robson.

With his sidekick Conroy, Robson pursues Louise and Conroy shoots Bradley's dog. Bradley knocks out Conroy, who falls and seriously injures his head. Robson reports this to the local sheriff, who wants Bradley back in jail. Tipped off by Helen, Bradley and Louise flee to the New York flat of an old cellmate, Tommy Logan, and there fall in love.

Traced by the police, Bradley escapes with a bullet in his shoulder. Meanwhile, Robson has accused Louise of theft in order to trace her and then tries to persuade her to go back to him. Since he is of a vindictive nature and she suspects him of trying to harm Bradley further, she agrees. Bradley arrives with Tommy Logan for a showdown just as Robson decides to murder Conroy so as to worsen the apparent case against Bradley. The two burst in and expose his plot at the last moment.

Cast 
Fay Wray as Louise Loring
Ralph Bellamy as John Bradley
Melvyn Douglas as Tony Robson
Roscoe Ates as Tommy Logan
Ruth Gillette as Lil Logan
Joe King as Detective
Nell O'Day as Helen Grant
Frank Otto as Kraus
Reed Brown Jr. as Conroy
Granville Bates as Sheriff Grant
Charles Williams as Clerk
Frank Shannon as Prison Warden
Cliff Dunstan as Doctor

External links 

1934 films
1934 crime drama films
American black-and-white films
American crime drama films
Films based on short fiction
Films based on works by Dashiell Hammett
Films directed by Phil Rosen
RKO Pictures films
1930s English-language films
1930s American films